"Under stjernerne på himlen" ("Under the stars of the sky") was the  entry in the Eurovision Song Contest 1993, performed in Danish by the Tommy Seebach Band.

Seebach wrote the song as a lullaby to his daughter, and his family encouraged him to suggest it as a finalist for the Danish final in 1993, where it won. At the Eurovision Song Contest, the song was performed fifth on the night, following 's Annie Cotton with "Moi, tout simplement" and preceding 's Katerina Garbi with "Ellada, Hora Tou Fotos". At the close of voting, it had received 9 points, placing 22nd in a field of 25.

The disappointing result at this contest, coupled with the expansion of the contest following the breakup of Yugoslavia and the Soviet Union, meant that Denmark was relegated from competing in the 1994 contest, causing them to miss a finale for the first time since 1977. The media reacted poorly to this, putting the blame on Seebach personally, which his son later revealed was one of the main reasons for his father's descent into alcoholism and depression, which led to his divorce and ultimately his early death ten years later. Although Seebach had overcome his alcoholism by this time, there was already permanent damage to his heart, which led to the deadly heart attack in 2003. "Under stjernerne på himlen" was played at Seebach's funeral, as the coffin was carried out of the church.

It was succeeded as Danish representative at the 1995 contest (to which Denmark had been invited) by Aud Wilken with "Fra Mols til Skagen".

Rasmus Seebach version

Rasmus Seebach recorded a cover of his father's song. The track is included in Rasmus' second album Mer' end kærlighed and was released in October 2011 as a single reaching #3 in the Hitlisten, the Danish Singles Chart. It was certified 3× Platinum for the track and an additional Platinum for streaming.

External links
Lyrics and translation 
Hear Tommy Seebach's version
Hear Rasmus Seebach's version

References

Eurovision songs of Denmark
Eurovision songs of 1993
Danish-language songs
2011 singles
Rasmus Seebach songs
Songs with lyrics by Keld Heick
1993 songs
Songs with music by Tommy Seebach